Suzanne (Denise) Stevens (born 1950) is a Canadian singer, based in Montreal and active during the 1970s and 1980s. She won the Juno Award for Most Promising Female Vocalist of the Year in 1975. Her best-known song is a disco-styled remake of the 1965 Barbara Lewis hit "Make Me Your Baby".

She was a receptionist until her successful performance on a Montreal talent show launched her recording career. Stevens performed in both English and French.

She was also host of the Global Television musical variety series For Lovers Only which began in September 1978 and featured lounge pianist Lou Snider.

Partial discography
 1973: En route (Capitol)
 1975: Love's the Only Game in Town (Capitol) 
 1976: Moi, de la tête aux pieds (Capitol) 
 1977: Crystal Carriage (Capitol)
 1978: Stardust Lady (Capitol) 
 1979: Les nuits sont trop longues (Capitol)

References

External links
Jam! Pop Encyclopedia: Suzanne Stevens

1950 births
Living people
Juno Award for Breakthrough Artist of the Year winners
Singers from Quebec
French-language singers of Canada
Capitol Records artists
Canadian television variety show hosts
20th-century Canadian women singers